Ironic process theory (IPT) is first proposed by Daniel Wegner in 1987 . It is a psychological phenomenon suggesting that when individuals try to avoid thinking about or feeling a certain emotion deliberately, a paradoxical effect is produced. This effect causes an increase in the frequency and intensity of those thoughts and emotions. IPT is also known as ironic rebound, or the white bear problem. 

The phenomenon was identified through thought suppression studies in experimental psychology. Social psychologist Daniel Wegner first studied ironic process theory in a laboratory setting in 1987. Ironic mental processes have been shown in a variety of situations, where they are usually created or worsened by stress. In extreme cases, ironic mental processes result in intrusive thoughts about doing something immoral or out of character, which can be troubling to the individual. These findings have since guided clinical practice. For example, they show why it would be unproductive to try to suppress anxiety-producing or depressing thoughts.

Mechanism 
Wegner and colleagues studied the theory of ironic processes, which proposes that successful thought suppression requires two distinct mental processes to be performed simultaneously. The first process is the operating process, which helps individuals to use mental effort to avoid the repetitive occurrence of a thought, an object, or an emotion. It works continuously until the though disappears from the mind completely. Monitoring process is the second one, which detects unwanted thoughts and replaces them by focusing on other objects.

When individuals' attention is occupied by another task, their mental resources are limited, making it difficult to conduct the operating process. However, the monitoring process continues, allowing them to be aware of unwanted thoughts. This may result in a decrease or cessation of their ability to suppress the thoughts, and the unwanted thoughts may become even more prominent. 

This theory explains the effects of increased cognitive load by emphasizing that where there is cognitive effort, the monitoring process may supplant the conscious process, also suggesting that in order for thought suppression to be effective, a balance between the two processes must exist, with the cognitive demand not being so great as to let the monitoring process interrupt the conscious processes. A 2006 study found that individual differences may be able to account for differences.

Original experiment 
The first study investigating the paradoxical effects of thought suppression was conducted in laboratory condition by Daniel Wegner in 1987. Wegner was an American social psychologist who specialized in using experimental psychology to explore issues related to mental control, conscious will, etc. This interest was sparked by Freud's study of psychopathology, which emphasized unconscious repression as the only way to successfully suppress unwanted thoughts. However, this theory failed to explain cases where individuals consciously tried to hide a thought. Studies have shown that conscious thought suppression is difficult and often results in the thought returning to the mind. To explain these findings, Wegner and other researchers conducted experiments, with Wegner using two laboratory experiments in 1987 where participants were asked to will away the thought of a white bear.

In the first study, 34 participants were asked to read instructions encouraging them to describe their thoughts verbally. They were randomly allocated to either initial suppression or initial expression condition, which only differed in the order of tasks. The suppression task required participants not to think of “white bear”; while the expression task asked them to think of a white bear. In both tasks, participants had to ring the bell every time they thought of a white bear. Results showed that the thought of the white bear occurred more frequently in the expression task following initial suppression. Initial suppression produced a rebound effect, raising the intensity of the unwanted thought in the expression task.

The second experiment added a third group, asking participants to think of a red Volkswagen as a distractor during the suppression task. The results confirmed previous findings and showed that the frequency of the suppressed thought decreased when a distractor was present during the initial suppression task.

Wegner explained the rebound effect by suggesting that individuals who try to suppress a thought encounter difficulty and become curious about why the thought cannot be removed. Although they may be able to suppress the thought temporarily, later reminders of the thought can produce a preoccupation with the formerly hidden thought. Initial suppression therefore paradoxically results in raising the frequency of unwanted thoughts eventually.

Criticism 
It is unclear if the original experiment's findings are generalizable to other stimuli. Wegner's study used a white bear, and it is uncertain if the ironic suppression effect occurs when suppressing other items. The nature of the thought being suppressed, such as whether it is emotional, easily imagined, familiar, or complex, may also impact the results.

Evidence

Eating behaviour of restrained eaters 
The ironic process theory predicts that suppressing the urge to eat can paradoxically surge overeating due to limited cognitive resources. Boom et al. conducted an experiment in 2002 to investigate the interaction between suppression, distraction, and the perceived calorie content of the food stimuli. The experiment was a “2 (restrained/unrestrained) * 2 (distraction yes/no) * 2 (perceived calories high/low) design, in which subjects consumed ice-cream in a taste test situation”. Ice-cream consumption was then measured. Results showed that restrained participant ate more than the unrestrained, and when there was a distraction, they ate even more. These findings supported the theory. Their attempts to inhibit their desire to eat only produced an ironic result - eating more ice-cream.

Anger suppression on Pain severity and Pain behaviours 
Burns et al. conducted an experiment in 2008 to investigate the relationship between angry suppression, pain severity and pain behaviours in chronic low back pain patients. Based on Ironic Process Theory, the researchers supposed that suppressing anger during provocation would paradoxically increase later pain severity due to enhanced accessibility of anger. Participants were randomly assigned to either suppression or no suppression group. During the experiment, they firstly completed a task inducing their anger, followed by pain behaviour task. The suppression group reported greater anger and pain intensity and showed more pain behaviors. “Attempts to suppress anger may aggravate pain related to their clinical condition through ironically increased feelings of anger.”

Application 
The ironic process theory can be applied in the treatment for patients with mood disorders, such as anxiety and depression. The attempts of those patients who try to avoid their negative thoughts and feelings, such as suicidal ideas and frustration, may contradictorily make the thoughts even more persistent in their minds. “Trying not to be sad could over time engender severe sadness.” Therefore, therapists should inform patients that depression may be beneficial and encourage them to embrace their feelings rather than suppress them. This approach has been shown to reduce depression in studies.

Other manifestation

Memorization and mnemonics
Although in certain domains, such as memorization, it appears that ironic effects of attempting to remember vary with the level of mental control over mnemonic processing and may simply be due to ineffective mental strategies.

"Intentional memory processes and their associated mnemonic strategies can be viewed as one form of mental control", When we attempt to exert influence over our memories we engage in mental control in the form of mnemonics our faculties of memory". because "mental control occurs when people suppress a thought, concentrate on a sensation, inhibit an emotion, maintain a mood, stir up a desire, squelch a craving, or otherwise exert influence on their own mental states".

Experience sampling
The experience sampling or daily diary method is one way that psychologists attempt to scientifically measure thoughts. This involves "interrupting people as they go about their daily lives and asking them to record the thoughts they are having right at that moment, in that place", often by using "clickers".

One research team at Ohio State University tried to figure out how often people think about sex by using so-called "clickers", asking the 283 college students to click each time they thought about sex, food, or sleep (there were three groups of students). The study found that on average men had 19 thoughts about sex per day (the highest being 388 times per day) whereas women thought about sex ten times per day. Among the study's flaws were that the researchers had not taken ironic process theory into their experimental design—students "were given a clicker by the researchers and asked to record when they thought about sex (or food or sleep). Imagine them walking away from the psychology department, holding the clicker in their hand, trying hard not to think about sex all the time, yet also trying hard to remember to press the clicker every time they did think about it."

Solution 
Strategies to promote success thought suppression:

1.     Focus on another object as distractor.

2.     Set aside the thought that you want to suppress.

3.     Increase your mental load through multitasking.

4.     Expose yourself to the thought.

5.     Strengthen your mental control by practice.

In popular culture
Similar ideas appear throughout popular culture and sayings, often with variations on animal and color, such as "It's as hard as trying not to think of a pink rhinoceros."

Ironic process theory is also the basis for the mind game known as "The Game", which constitutes trying not to think about the Game.

At the end of the 1984 movie Ghostbusters, the characters are asked to think of a form for the coming of Gozer. They instruct each other not to think of anything which sees. One of the team, Ray, thinking of what he considers to be an innocuous thought of the Stay Puft Marshmallow Man, who then terrorizes them.

In an episode of Buzz Lightyear of Star Command, Mira uses Ironic Process Theory to outsmart the Emperor Zurg, who has stolen her mind reading powers.

The idea figures heavily into the episode "White Bear" of British television series Black Mirror.

In the DC Comic Emperor Joker, The Ironic Process is used by Superman to defeat the Joker had gained godlike powers from Mister Mxyzptlk.

In the Web Series SanderSides, The Character of Logan brings up the "White Bear Experiment" while the gang is dealing with Intrusive Thoughts.

Alternative 
Psychological reactance theory is a more ultimate explanation for the rebound effect than the ironic process theory. This theory suggests that humans have an innate need for freedom. When their autonomy is threatened, they experience an unpleasant emotional arousal, reactance. To restore their freedom, they engage in behaviors that resist the threat. In the case of the white bear experiment, participants felt that their freedom was taken away when they were instructed not to think of a white bear, and they consequently thought of the bear even more to reestablish their autonomy.

See also
 Self-fulfilling prophecy
 Streisand effect

References

Further reading 
 

Cognition